Exochomus quadripustulatus, common name pine ladybird or pine lady beetle, is a species of beetle of the family Coccinellidae. The distribution range of Exochomus quadripustulatus includes Europe, Northern Asia (excluding China), and North America.

Description
Exochomus quadripustulatus can reach a length of about 4-6 millimeters. It is almost circular, convex and shining, with a flange around the base. The color is quite variable and may change with ageing. Usually elytra are black with two larger red comma-shaped spots and two smaller red round or oval spots. The color of these spots can also be orange or yellow, but completely reddish brown specimens may occur. The pine ladybird in both adult and larval stages preys aphids and scale insects, especially Diaspidiotus perniciosus. Adults overwinter.

Distribution
This species is present in most of Europe, in the eastern Palearctic realm, and in the Near East. It was first recorded in Ireland (County Armagh) in 2014.

Habitat
This fairly common ladybug can be found from April to October on conifers and in areas with deciduous trees, but it can also occur elsewhere.

Gallery

References

External links
NCBI Taxonomy Browser, Brumus quadripustulatus
 Stippen.nl 
 Nature Spots
 Bug Guide
 El arbol de la vida

Further reading
 American Beetles, Volume II: Polyphaga: Scarabaeoidea through Curculionoidea, Arnett, R.H. Jr., M. C. Thomas, P. E. Skelley and J. H. Frank. (eds.). 2002. CRC Press LLC, Boca Raton, Florida.
 American Insects: A Handbook of the Insects of America North of Mexico, Ross H. Arnett. 2000. CRC Press.
 Kovár, Ivo (1995). Revision of the Genera Brumus Muls. and Exochomus Redtb. (Coleoptera, Coccinellidae) of the Palaearctic Region. Part I. Acta Entomologica Musei Nationalis Pragae, vol. 44, 5–124.
 Peterson Field Guides: Beetles, Richard E. White. 1983. Houghton Mifflin Company.
 The Coccinellidae (Coleoptera) of America North of Mexico, Robert D. Gordon. 1985. Journal of the New York Entomological Society, Vol. 93, No. 1.
 Vandenberg, Natalia J. / Arnett, Ross H. Jr., M. C. Thomas, P. E. Skelley, and J. H. Frank, eds. (2002). Family 93; Coccinellidae Latreille 1807. American Beetles, vol. 2; Polyphaga: Scarabaeoidea through Curculionoidea, 371–389.

Beetles of Europe
Coccinellidae
Taxa named by Carl Linnaeus
Beetles described in 1758